Daryna Zevina (born 1 September 1994) is a Ukrainian swimmer.

Career
She has won several international juniors medals in her career, a gold medal at the 100 meter backstroke and a bronze medal at the 200 meter backstroke during the 2010 European Short Course Swimming Championships.

Also, in the 2010 Youth Olympic Games held in Singapore, she won a gold medal in the Women's 100 metre backstroke, a silver medal in the Women's 50m Backstroke and a bronze medal in the Women's 200 metre backstroke.

Zevina represented Ukraine at the 2012 Summer Olympics in London.

References

External links

1994 births
Living people
Sportspeople from Kyiv
Ukrainian female backstroke swimmers
Swimmers at the 2010 Summer Youth Olympics
Olympic swimmers of Ukraine
Swimmers at the 2012 Summer Olympics
Swimmers at the 2016 Summer Olympics
Medalists at the FINA World Swimming Championships (25 m)
European Aquatics Championships medalists in swimming
Universiade medalists in swimming
Universiade silver medalists for Ukraine
Youth Olympic gold medalists for Ukraine
Medalists at the 2013 Summer Universiade
Swimmers at the 2020 Summer Olympics
21st-century Ukrainian women